Sylvester Urban "Blix" Donnelly (January 21, 1914 – June 20, 1976) was an American professional baseball pitcher. In all, he had an 18-year (1935–52) professional career.

A lifelong resident of Olivia, Minnesota, Donnelly spent nine seasons in minor league baseball; in 1941, he had 28 wins and 304 strikeouts for the Class C Springfield Cardinals of the Western Association. Donnelly was promoted to the Major Leagues and the St. Louis Cardinals as a 30-year-old rookie in 1944. In 27 games, four as a starting pitcher, he posted a career-best 2.12 earned run average (ERA), won two of three decisions, and collected four saves as the Redbirds won their third successive National League (NL) championship.

Donnelly then turned in two outstanding performances in relief in the "All-St. Louis" 1944 World Series. In his first outing, in Game 1, he retired all six St. Louis Browns to face him, but the Browns held on for a 2–1 triumph. Then, in Game 2, Donnelly relieved starting pitcher Max Lanier in the eighth inning of a 2–2 tie. Donnelly worked four scoreless frames, allowing two hits and one base on balls while striking out seven, and was the winning pitcher when pinch hitter Ken O'Dea drove home the winning run in the bottom of the 11th inning. The Cardinals went on to win the World Series over the Browns in six games.

He was a member of the 1950 "Whiz Kids" edition that won the NL pennant; however, at age 36, Donnelly was one of the older players on the squad and did not appear in the 1950 World Series.

Donnelly's MLB career stat line includes 659 hits allowed in 691 innings pitched, with 306 bases on balls, and 296 strikeouts. He recorded 27 complete games as a starter and 12 saves as a reliever.

References

External links

1914 births
1976 deaths
Baltimore Orioles (IL) players
Baseball players from Minnesota
Boston Braves players
Daytona Beach Islanders players
Decatur Commodores players
Duluth Dukes players
Fort Worth Cats players
Major League Baseball pitchers
People from Olivia, Minnesota
Philadelphia Phillies players
Rochester Red Wings players
Sacramento Solons players
St. Louis Cardinals players
Springfield Cardinals players
Superior Blues players